The Dunster Museum & Doll Collection in Dunster, Somerset, England houses a collection of more than 800 dolls from around the world, based on the collection of the late Mollie Hardwick, who died in 1970 and donated her collection to the village memorial hall committee.

Established in 1971, the collection includes a display of British and foreign dolls in various costumes.

Thirty-two of the dolls were stolen during a burglary in 1992 and have never been recovered.

References

External links
Dunster Museum & Doll Collection - official site

Museums in Somerset
Toy museums in England
Museums established in 1971
Children's museums in the United Kingdom
Doll museums